DM-1 may refer to:

Crew Dragon Demo-1, the first—uncrewed—demonstration flight of Crew Dragon
Lippisch DM-1, a delta-wing glider, built in Germany during WW2 
USS Stribling (DD-96), a United States Destroyer later converted into a minelayer, DM-1